Chamaesphecia anatolica is a moth of the family Sesiidae. It is found in Turkey, Greece, Serbia and Montenegro, Romania and Hungary.

The larvae feed on the roots of Nepeta species, including Nepeta spruneri and Nepeta parnassica.

References

Moths described in 1938
Sesiidae
Moths of Europe
Moths of Asia